George Brown House may refer to:

in Canada
George Brown House (Toronto)

in the United States
George Brown Mansion, Chesterton, Indiana, listed on the NRHP in Porter County, Indiana
George T. Brown House, Junction City, Kansas, listed on the NRHP in Geary County, Kansas
George I. Brown House, Nicholasville, Kentucky, listed on the NRHP in Jessamine County, Kentucky
George M. Brown House, Provo, Utah, listed on the NRHP in Utah County, Utah
George McKesson Brown Estate-Coindre Hall, Huntington Station, New York, listed on the NRHP in Suffolk County, New York